Sonagazi is a town and municipality in Feni district in the division of Chittagong. It is the administrative centre and urban centre of Sonagazi Upazila.

References 

Populated places in Chittagong Division
Cities in Bangladesh